Cuthbert is a ghost town in Mitchell County, Texas, United States. Cuthbert was established in 1890 when the founder D. T. Bozeman built a wagonyard and store. The community and post office were named for Thomas Cuthbertson, a family friend of the Bozemans.  By the early 1920s, Cuthbert had a church, two stores, a blacksmith shop, a cotton gin, telephone office, and a school. In 1920 the T. and P. Abrams No. 1 oil well, one of the first commercial oil ventures in the Permian Basin, was drilled just over a mile north of the town. A post office, two businesses, and a population of twenty-five were reported at the community in 1936, the year that its school was consolidated with that of Colorado City. After World War II the improvement of rural roads in the area led to Cuthbert's decline as it lost its trade to Colorado City. The Cuthbert post office was discontinued about 1960, when the town reported one business and a population of twenty-five. By 1974 only a cemetery and scattered farms remained in the area.

See also
List of ghost towns in Texas
Texas State Highway 350
Ira, Texas
Colorado River (Texas)

References

External links

Unincorporated communities in Mitchell County, Texas
Unincorporated communities in Texas
Ghost towns in Central Texas